Taranis allo is a species of sea snail, a marine gastropod mollusk in the family Raphitomidae.

Description
The length of the shell attains 4.5 mm, its diameter 3 mm.

Distribution
This marine species occurs off Djibouti.

References

External links
 
 Jousseaume F. (1934). Description d'un gastropode nouveau de la Mer Rouge. [Posthumous publication edited by E. Lamy. Journal de Conchyliologie. 78(1): 67-71]

allo
Gastropods described in 1934